Vĩnh Hưng may refer to several places in Vietnam, including:

Vĩnh Hưng District, a rural district of Long An Province
Vĩnh Hưng, Hanoi, a ward of Hoàng Mai District
Vĩnh Hưng (township), a township and capital of Vĩnh Hưng District
Vĩnh Hưng, Bạc Liêu, a commune of Vĩnh Lợi District
Vĩnh Hưng, Thanh Hóa, a commune of Vĩnh Lộc District

See also
Vĩnh Hưng A, a commune of Vĩnh Lợi District in Bạc Liêu Province
Vinh Hưng, a commune of Phú Lộc District in Thừa Thiên-Huế Province
Vĩnh Hùng, a commune of Vĩnh Lộc District in Thanh Hóa Province